The Congressional Hispanic Caucus Institute (CHCI) is a Hispanic nonprofit and nonpartisan 501(c)(3) leadership development organization established in 1978 by organizing members of the Congressional Hispanic Caucus (CHC) and is headquartered in Washington D.C. 

For over 40 years, CHCI has served as a principal resource, curating lasting connections between promising Latino/a/Latinx leaders with corporations, government agencies, nonprofits, and various organizations. CHCI supports the continued progress of Hispanic and Latino communities, ensuring their interests are represented across all sectors of society. CHCI focuses its vision to develop educated and civic-minded Hispanic leaders, dedicated to the advancement of U.S. society.

The institution is governed by voting members of its board of directors and supported by an advisory council composed of Members of Congress, corporate executives, industry experts, nonprofit leaders, and community advocates.

U.S. Representative for Arizona's 7th congressional district, Representative Ruben Gallego currently holds the position of CHCI Chair, and Marco A. Davis serves as president and CEO.

History 
In 1976, five Hispanic Members of Congress—Herman Badillo (N.Y.), Baltasar Corrada (P.R.), Eligio "Kika" de la Garza (TX), Henry B. Gonzalez (TX), and Edward Roybal (C.A.)— organized the Congressional Hispanic Caucus (CHC), a legislative service organization of the United States House of Representatives dedicated to issues affecting Hispanics and Latinos in the United States.

Two years later, in 1978, four members of the CHC, U.S. House of Representatives: Edward Roybal,  Eligio "Kika" de la Garza, Robert “Bobby” Garcia, and Baltasar Corrada established the Congressional Hispanic Caucus Institute (CHCI), a 501(c) (3) nonprofit organization to serve as the educational arm to increase access and opportunities for the Hispanic and Latino community. In 1985, the CHCI Board of Directors was expanded from public officials to include other influential Hispanic leaders, including business executives and community advocates.

Programs 
Graduate Fellowship Program
The CHCI Graduate Fellowship Program is a paid, nine-month fellowship based in Washington, D.C. for Latino leaders interested in a specific public policy area including K-12 education, health, housing, law, and energy. 

As part of the program, participants research a public policy issue that relates to Hispanic Americans in their particular area of academics and develop an analytical policy paper read during the Policy Briefing Series on Capitol Hill. Based on the topic, fellows will organize the briefing, identify relevant subject matter experts to serve as panelists, and moderate the session.

Public Policy Fellowship Program
The Public Policy Fellowship Program is a paid nine-month fellowship based in Washington, D.C., for recent Latino college graduates pursuing a career in public policy. Participants work to understand policy issues facing the Latino community and how to propose effective solutions in legislation across entities such as congressional offices, federal agencies, national nonprofit advocacy organizations, and government-related institutes. 

Congressional Internship Program 
The Congressional Internship Program consists of paid summer and semester internships in Washington, D.C., for Latino undergraduate students interested in working in legislation and congressional offices.

R2L NextGen 
Through the CHCI R2L NextGen program, Latino high school students participate in a week-long all-expenses-paid training in Washington, D.C.

Events 
Hispanic Heritage Month Events
Each year CHCI hosts a week of leadership events and celebrations in Washington D.C., kicking-off National Hispanic Heritage Month with a two-day Leadership Conference and Annual Awards Gala. Members of Congress, corporate executives, community activists, educators, celebrities, media personalities, nonprofit leaders, CHCI program participants, and CHCI alumni all come together to examine the critical issues affecting the Latino community and the nation. During the Annual Awards Gala, industry and community trailblazers are recognized and honored with the CHCI Medallion of Excellence award. With multiple categories, these awards go to individuals who serve as role models and examples of outstanding civic citizens in the Latino community. The honorees have a track record of contributions and accomplishments in their field with solid leadership and community involvement. The qualifying factor is philanthropic and civic engagement.

Medallion of Excellence
Excellence in the Arts
American Dream Medallion of Excellence
The Chair’s Medallion award is bestowed upon outstanding figures who have committed their lives to the betterment of Hispanic Americans. 
The Medallion of Excellence for a Distinguished Alumnus recognizes a CHCI alumnus who has made an outstanding contribution to the Latino/x community and who has thereby achieved distinction.

Industry Summits
CHCI puts on a variety of industry summits during the year tailored to address industry issues affecting the Latino community. Most recently, CHCI hosted the CHCI Economic Empowerment Summit and the CHCI Tech 2.0 Summit (1) back-to-back. Over 250 stakeholders, including members of Congress, thought leaders, corporate sponsors, industry advocates and experts, CHCI program participants and alumni, convene for high-level discussions and networking. These day-long summits consist of timely talks on industry challenges, best practices, trends, discoveries, nuanced realities, and opportunities.

See also

 Congressional Black Caucus Foundation

References 

1978 establishments in the United States
Hispanic_and_Latino_American_history
Hispanic Caucus
Politics and race in the United States